Mohammad Khalequzzaman Bangladesh Nationalist Party politician. He was elected a member of parliament from Cox's Bazar-3 in February 1996 and June 1996.

Biography 
Mohammad Khalequzzaman was born in Cox's Bazar District. His father Farid Ahmad was a member of the then National Assembly of Pakistan and Union Minister of Labor. Mother Rizia Ahmed. His younger brother Mohammad Sahiduzzaman was a Member of Parliament from Cox's Bazar-3 constituency.

Mohammad Khalequzzaman was a lawyer. He was elected to parliament from Cox's Bazar-3 as a Bangladesh Nationalist Party candidate in 15 February 1996 and 12 June 1996 Bangladeshi general election.

In the fifth national election of 1991, he was defeated as a BNP candidate from Cox's Bazar-3 (Sadar-Ramu) constituency.

Mohammad Khalequzzaman died on 28 September 2001.

References 

2001 deaths
People from Cox's Bazar District
Bangladesh Nationalist Party politicians
6th Jatiya Sangsad members
7th Jatiya Sangsad members